Hans Österman (born 1978) is a former ITHF table hockey world champion and journalist from Sweden. He was world champion in 1997, 2001, and 2005. As a journalist, he works for the newspaper Aftonbladet.

References

Table hockey players
1978 births
Living people
Place of birth missing (living people)
Date of birth missing (living people)
21st-century Swedish people